Helmut Adalbert Josef Schiff (30 January 1918 – 20 December 1982) was an Austrian composer and music educator.

Life and career 
Schiff was born in Bratislava. After studying philosophy and musicology at the University of Prague and the University of Bratislava. (1936 to 1938), he studied piano and composition with Johann Nepomuk David from 1939 to 1943 at the University of Music and Theatre Leipzig with Robert Teichmüller and Felix Petyrek. In addition, he also pursued piano studies at the University of Music and Performing Arts Vienna with Emil von Sauer in 1941 and taught at the Leipzig Music School.

He was married to Helga Riemann from 1944 to 1977. The couple lived from 1944 until the 1970s, first in Gmunden and later in Altmünster, interrupted by a six-year stay (1953 to 1959) in Hamburg for professional reasons.

Their sons were Hans Christian (born 1949) and Heinrich Schiff (1951-2016).

Schiff taught composition and piano at the Bruckner Conservatory from 1946, with interruptions through employment in music and secondary schools, until his death in 1982.

His estate is administered by the library of the Anton Bruckner Private University, with scholarships and prize money disbursed annually.

Works 
Zu seinen Werken gehören vier Symphonien, zahlreiche Konzerte, Klavierstücke, Kammermusik und Chöre. Helmut Schiff gehörte der Künstlervereinigung MAERZ an.

Students 
 Helmut Rogl
 Helmut Eder

References

Further reading 
 Franz Lettner: Künstler am Werk – Besuch bei Helmut Schiff, in Tagblatt 1965, Nr. 74.
 Franz Zamazal: Schmerzlicher Verlust. Zum Tode von Prof. Helmut Schiff, in: Kulturbericht, Jahrgang 1937 (1983), F. 1.
 Wolfgang Vokal: Helmut Schiff (1918–1982): ein oberösterreichischer Komponist und Musikpädagoge im Spannungsfeld der musikalischen Zeitströmungen. Ed. Innsalz, Ranshofen 2013, .

External links 
 

20th-century Austrian composers
20th-century Austrian male musicians
20th-century classical composers
Austrian music educators
1918 births
1982 deaths
Musicians from Bratislava
Czechoslovak emigrants to Austria